Cengiz Kurtoğlu (born 5 May 1959)  is a Turkish male Arabesque Music genre artist, musician, record producer, lyricist, songwriter, composer and pianist. He worked as a civil servant at a tea factory in Rize and moved to Istanbul in 1984. In 1984, his first album Sen Sözden Anlamaz Mısın? was released. His later albums helped him building a fan group called as Cengizciler (Fans of Cengiz). In 2010 Cengiz Kurtoğlu released an album called Sessizce.

Albums 

(1984) Sen Sözden Anlamaz Mısın? (Özer Plakçılık)
(1986) Unutulan (Özer Plakçılık)
(1987) Yıllarım (Özer Plakçılık)
(1988) Bizim Şarkımız (Özer Plakçılık)
(1989) Hayatımı Yaşıyorum (Özer Plakçılık)
(1990) Aşkımız İçin (Özer Plakçılık)
(1991) Gözlerin (Özer Plakçılık)
(1992) Sensiz Kutladım (Özer Plakçılık)
(1994) Seven Benim (Özer Plakçılık)
(1996) Seviyorum (Özer Plakçılık)
(1997) Unutulmayanlar / Unutulan (Özer Plakçılık)
(1998) Hain Geceler (Sindoma Muzik)
(1999) "Unutulmayanlar 2" (Özer Plakçılık)
(1999) Gözü Yaşlı Yaşanmıyor (Sindoma Muzik)
(1 Ocak 2000) "Hiç Aklıma Gelmemişti" (Özer Plakçılık)
(2000) Sözlerim Sevenlere (Sindoma Müzik)
(2001) Yalancı Bahar" (Sindoma Müzik)
(2002) Yorgun Yillarim (Sima Müzik)
(2003) "Sensiz Olmuyor" (Özer Plakçılık)
(2005) Ayrilik Saati (Sima Müzik)
(2006) "Canın Sağolsun" (Ati Müzik)
(2010) Sessizce (Esen Plak)
(2014) Saklı Düşler (Esen Plak)
(2018) Usta Çırak (with Hakan Altun) (Poll Production)
(2021) Kalpsiz (with Ayşen Birgör) (Fifth Floor Records)
(2022) Aşkın Cenneti'' (Poll Production)

External links 

 Official website

1959 births
Living people
Turkish oud players
Turkish music arrangers
Percussionists
Turkish electronic musicians
Turkish tambur players
Turkish classical qanun players
Turkish classical pianists
People from Arhavi
Synthesizers
New-age synthesizer players
Turkish folk-pop singers
Composers of Ottoman classical music
Turkish male songwriters
Musicians of Ottoman classical music
Turkish keyboardists
20th-century Turkish male musicians
21st-century Turkish male musicians
Turkish classical musicians
Turkish lyricists
Tanbur players
Turkish record producers
Turkish classical composers
Turkish people of Laz descent